Golden Lotus Award for Best Writing is the main category of Competition of Golden Lotus Awards, awarding to screenplay writer.

Award winners and nominees

2000s

2009 (1st)

2010s

2010 (2nd)

2011 (3rd)

2012 (4th)

2013 (5th)

2014 (6th)

2015 (7th)

2016 (8th)

2016 (8th)

2017 (9th)

References

External links

Golden Lotus Awards
Screenwriting awards for film
Awards established in 2009
2009 establishments in Macau